Lazar Spasić (born 4 June 1992) is a Serbian professional basketball coach and former player.

Playing career 
As a point guard, Spasić played for Tamiš, Mladost Čačak, Mladost Zaječar, and Rtanj. He retired as a player with Mladost Čačak in 2013.

Coaching career 
In 2013, Spasić started his coaching career as an assistant coach for Mladost Zemun in 2013, under Dragan Nikolić. In May 2016, he was promoted to the head coach for the 2016–17 KLS season at age 24. In summer of 2017, Spasić joined a training camp of the Slovenian national team upon invitation of their head coach Igor Kokoškov. In late 2017, he joined Rtanj as the head coach.

On 30 June 2019, Zdravlje hired Spasić as their new head coach. In July 2022, he signed a contract extension with Zdravlje.

References

External links
 Coach Profile at eurobasket.com
 Player Profile at eurobasket.com

1992 births
Living people
KK Mladost Zemun coaches
KK Rtanj coaches
KK Zdravlje coaches
KK Mladost Čačak players
KK Tamiš players
People from Zaječar
Point guards
Serbian men's basketball coaches
Serbian men's basketball players